The discography of Alejandro Sanz, a Spanish singer, songwriter and musician, consists of twelve studio albums, three live albums, three compilation albums, thirty-five singles (including all singles from studio, live, compilation albums and collaborations with other singers). 

Sanz released his debut album at age nineteen, although he did not gain commercial success in Spain until his second release, Viviendo Deprisa. His next two records, Si Tú Me Miras (1993) and 3 (1995) also fared well commercially, but it was his 1997 breakthrough album Más that garnered international success. El Alma al Aire followed in 2000, selling more than a million copies in its first week. In 2002, he became the first Spanish artist to record an MTV Unplugged album.

His collaboration with Shakira on the 2005 single "La Tortura" reached number one on several charts worldwide. He experimented with more diverse styles of music with the albums No Es lo Mismo (2003) and El Tren de los Momentos (2006), while his 2009 release, Paraíso Express served as a return to form for the musician. Sanz signed to Universal Music Group in 2011 and released his tenth studio album, La Música No Se Toca, in 2012, followed by Sirope in 2015.

Albums

Studio albums

Live albums

Compilation albums

Special editions

Singles

As lead artist

As featured artist

Other charted songs

DVDs
1998: El Concierto: Tour Más 98
1998: Los Videos
2001: El Alma al Aire: En Directo
2004: En Concierto: Gira No Es lo Mismo 2004
2005: Los Conciertos
2005: Grandes Éxitos: Los Videos 91-04
2007: El Tren de los Momentos: En Vivo Desde Buenos Aires
2010: Canciones Para Un Paraíso En Vivo

References

Discography
Latin pop music discographies
Discographies of Spanish artists